Yonggang-dong may refer to

Yonggang-dong, Gangneung
Yonggang-dong, Gwangju
Yonggang-dong, Gyeongju
Yonggang-dong, Sacheon
Yonggang-dong, Seoul